Jan Priiskorn-Schmidt (born 22 February 1951) is a Danish film actor. He appeared in 25 films between 1960 and 1972. He was born in Copenhagen, Denmark.

Filmography

 Rektor på sengekanten (1972)
 Min søsters børn, når de er værst (1971)
 Min søsters børn vælter byen (1968)
 Min søsters børn på bryllupsrejse (1967)
 Min søsters børn (1966)
 Slå først, Frede! (1965)
 Een pige og 39 sømænd (1965)
 Pigen og millionæren (1965)
 Flådens friske fyre (1965)
 Passer passer piger (1965)
 De blå undulater (1965)
 Sommer i Tyrol (1964)
 Mord for åbent tæppe (1964)
 Døden kommer til middag (1964)
 Støv for alle pengene (1963)
 Peters landlov (1963)
 Pigen og pressefotografen (1963)
 Venus fra Vestø (1962)
 Den rige enke (1962)
 Flemming på kostskole (1961)
 Støv på hjernen (1961)
 Soldaterkammerater på efterårsmanøvre (1961)
 Sorte Shara (1961)
 Mine tossede drenge (1961)
 Flemming og Kvik (1960)

References

External links

1951 births
Living people
Danish male film actors
Male actors from Copenhagen